The Museum of Timekeeping and Mechanical Musical Instruments (German: Museum für Uhren und mechanische Musikinstrumente, MUMM) is a museum in the village of Oberhofen am Thunersee, Switzerland, in the Bernese Oberland. It is dedicated to both horology and mechanical music.

The museum is about halfway between the major tourist centers of Bern and Interlaken, and housed in the manor house of the historic Wichterheer estate, on the shore of Lake Thun.

The core of the museum's collection consists of two formerly private collections owned by Hans-Peter Hertig (clocks) and Kurt Matter (mechanical music).  The collection is particularly strong in early rustic clocks from the Bernese region of Switzerland, and in beggars' organs and Swiss-made comb music boxes. The museum can only be visited by guided tour.

See also
Horology
 List of music museums
Similar museums:
British Horological Institute
Clockmakers' Museum
Cuckooland Museum
Deutsches Uhrenmuseum
National Watch and Clock Museum
Mussee Internationale d'Horlogerie
Royal Observatory, Greenwich

References

External links 
 Official website

Horological museums in Switzerland
Uhren
Oberhofen am Thunersee
Museums in the Canton of Bern